Reinhold Seeböck (born 15 April 1943) is an Austrian speed skater. He competed in the men's 5000 metres event at the 1964 Winter Olympics.

References

1943 births
Living people
Austrian male speed skaters
Olympic speed skaters of Austria
Speed skaters at the 1964 Winter Olympics
Sportspeople from Vienna